A series of specimen banknotes was printed in 1946 for the Government of Kutch, but were never put into production. A single specimen set of these notes is known to exist.

The notes depict a portrait of the Maharaja of Kutch at the right hand side of the notes. The notes are inscribed in English and Kutchi.

Catalogue numbers

PS341.  25 koris. ND. (1946).
PS342.  50 koris. ND. (1946).
PS343. 100 koris. ND. (1946).
PS344. 500 koris. ND. (1946).

See also 

 Kutch kori

References

 

Kutch
History of Kutch
Economy of Gujarat